Callomecyna is a genus of beetles in the family Cerambycidae, containing the following species:

 Callomecyna leehsuehae Yamasako & Chou, 2014
 Callomecyna superba Tippmann, 1965
 Callomecyna tigrinula Holzschuh, 1999

References

Apomecynini
Cerambycidae genera